Ariane is a series of European civilian expendable launch vehicles for space launch use. The name comes from the French spelling of the mythological character Ariadne. France first proposed the Ariane project and it was officially agreed upon at the end of 1973 after discussions between France, Germany and the UK. The project was Western Europe's second attempt to develop its own launcher following the unsuccessful Europa project. The Ariane project was code-named L3S (the French abbreviation for third-generation substitution launcher).

The European Space Agency (ESA) charged Airbus Defence and Space with the development of all Ariane launchers and of the testing facilities, while Arianespace, a 32.5% CNES (French government space agency) commercial subsidiary created in 1980, handles production, operations and marketing. Arianespace launches Ariane rockets from the Guiana Space Centre at Kourou in French Guiana.

Ariane versions 

Ariane 1 was a three-stage launcher, derived from missile technology. The first two stages used hypergolic propellants and the third stage used cryogenic liquid hydrogen and liquid oxygen (LH2/LOX). Ariane 2–4 were enhancements of the basic vehicle. The major differences are improved versions of the engines, allowing stretched first- and third-stage tanks and greater payloads. The largest versions can launch two satellites, mounted in the SPELDA (Structure Porteuse Externe pour Lancements Doubles Ariane) adapter.

Such later versions are often seen with strap-on boosters. These layouts are designated by suffixes after the generation number. First is the total number of boosters, then letters designating liquid- or solid-fuelled stages. For example, an Ariane 42P is an Ariane 4 with two solid-fuel boosters. An Ariane 44LP has two solid, two liquid boosters, and a 44L has four liquid-fuel boosters.

Ariane 5 is a nearly complete redesign. The two hypergolic lower stages are replaced with a single LH2/LOX core stage. This simplifies the stack, along with the use of a single core engine (Vulcain). Because the core cannot lift its own weight, two solid-fuel boosters are strapped to the sides. The boosters can be recovered for examination, but are not reused. There are two versions of the upper stage, one hypergolic and restartable with a single Aestus engine  and the other with a HM7B cryogenic engine burning LH2/LOX.

On 4 May 2007, an Ariane 5-ECA rocket set a new commercial payload record, lifting two satellites with a combined mass of 9.4 tonnes.

By January 2006, 169 Ariane flights had boosted 290 satellites, successfully placing 271 of them on orbit (223 main passengers and 48 auxiliary passengers) for a total mass of 575,000 kg successfully delivered on orbit. Attesting to the ubiquity of Ariane launch vehicles, France's Cerise satellite, which was orbited by an Ariane in 1995, struck a discarded Ariane rocket stage in 1996. The incident marked the first verified case of a collision with a piece of catalogued space debris.

On February 16, 2011, the 200th Ariane rocket was launched, successfully carrying the Johannes Kepler ATV into low Earth orbit and providing International Space Station with supplies.

On November 26, 2019, flight number 250 was performed, lifting two communications satellites: TIBA-1 and Inmarsat-5 F5 (GX5).

On December 25, 2021, Ariane flight VA256 lifted NASA's James Webb Space Telescope towards Earth/Sun Lagrange point L2.

See also
List of Ariane launches
Liquid fly-back booster
Comparison of orbital launchers families
Diamant
Europa (rocket)
Vega
French space program
European Space Agency
Arianespace

References

External links
European Space Agency
Arianespace
Downloadable paper models of various ESA spacecraft (Ariane at the bottom)

 
Space program of France
European Space Agency
Rocket families